Eski Mosque or Old Mosque (meaning "Old Mosque"), can refer to a number of mosques across the former Ottoman Empire:

 Bulgaria
 Eski Mosque, Yambol, Bulgaria

 Greece
 Church of the Acheiropoietos in Thessaloniki, known in Ottoman times as Eski Mosque
 Eski Mosque, Komotini

 Republic of Macedonia
 Eski Mosque, Kumanovo

 Turkey
 Eski Mosque, Adana, now Yağ Camii
 Old Mosque, Edirne
 Old Mosque, Mersin
 Old Mosque, Tarsus

See also
 Eski Imaret Mosque
 Yeni Mosque (disambiguation)